Cédric Duchesne (born 12 October 1975) is a retired French football goalkeeper.

His previous clubs include FC Istres, US Créteil-Lusitanos and FC Martigues.

External links

1975 births
Living people
French footballers
Stade Malherbe Caen players
FC Istres players
US Créteil-Lusitanos players
Nîmes Olympique players
Association football goalkeepers
Footballers from Caen